Glogovica ( or ) is a settlement in the Municipality of Ivančna Gorica in central Slovenia. It lies east of Ivančna Gorica and south of Šentvid pri Stični in the historical region of Lower Carniola. The municipality is now included in the Central Slovenia Statistical Region.

References

External links

Glogovica on Geopedia

Populated places in the Municipality of Ivančna Gorica